Lord Bhavanishankar is Lord Shiva along with his consort Bhavani (Parvati).
This is a form of Lord Shiva with his Shakti.

Lord Bhavanishankar is the patron deity of the Shri Saunsthan Gaudapadacharya Kavale Math.

Forms of Shiva